Vincenzo Amato (born 30 March 1966) is an Italian actor and sculptor.

Life and career 
Born in Palermo, the son of the stage director and folk musician  Emma Muzzi Loffredo, after high school Amato moved to Rome, where his mother lived.

Always dedicated to painting, finished the university Amato focused on iron sculpting.  After a couple of exhibitions at the art gallery Il Gabbiano in Rome, he moved to Manhattan, and he began to exhibit with some success at the Earl McGrath Gallery in New York. In the US, Amato became friends with the director Emanuele Crialese, who directed his debut as an actor in the film Once We Were Strangers.  His career as an actor had a breakthrough with the role of the fisherman Pietro in Crialise's next film, Respiro.

In 2007, he was nominated for David di Donatello for Best Actor for his performance in Nuovomondo.

Partial filmography

 Once We Were Strangers (1997) - Antonio
 Prison Song (2001) - Store Owner
 Ciao America (2002) - Bongo
 Respiro (2002) - Pietro
 Nuovomondo (2006) - Salvatore Mancuso
 The Sweet and the Bitter (2007) - Vito Scordia, Saro's father
 Autumn Dawn (2007) - Marco
 Einstein (2008, TV Movie) - Albert Einstein
 Did You Hear About the Morgans? (2009) - Girard Rabelais
 School Is Over (2010) - Aldo Talarico
 Girl on a Bicycle (2013) - Paolo Moretti
 Exilados do Vulcão (2013) - Pedro
 ReWined (2013) - Giovanni
 War Story (2014) - Filippo
 Darker Than Midnight (2014) - Massimo, il padre di Davide
 Unbroken (2014) - Anthony
 The Wannabe (2015) - Richie
 Soundtrack (2015) - Paolo
 Abbraccialo per me (2016) - Pietro
 The Habit of Beauty (2016) - Ernesto
 It's the Law (2017) - Pierpaolo Natoli
 Sicilian Ghost Story (2017) - Padre di Luna
 Veleni (2017) - Dottor Bonadies
 The Assassination of Gianni Versace: American Crime Story (2018) - Versace Spokesman
 Unbroken: Path to Redemption (2018) - Anthony Zamperini
 Tornare (2019) - Marc Bennet
 Caught by a Wave (2021) - Antonio
 Red Notice (2021) - Director Gallo

References

External links

 

1966 births
Living people
Italian male film actors
Italian male television actors
Italian male stage actors
Male actors from Palermo
Artists from Palermo
Italian sculptors
Italian male sculptors